False as Water is a 1985 Swedish drama film directed by Hans Alfredson. Alfredson won the award for Best Director and Malin Ek won the award for Best Actress at the 21st Guldbagge Awards.

Cast
 Malin Ek as Clara
 Sverre Anker Ousdal as John
 Marie Göranzon as Anna (as Mari Göranzon)
 Stellan Skarsgård as Stig
 Örjan Ramberg as Carl
 Lotta Ramel as Fia
 Philip Zandén as Jens (as Philip Zanden)
 Catharina Alinder as Tina
 Martin Lindström as Lill-John
 Magnus Uggla as Schüll, shop owner
 Folke Lind as The Old Man
 Ing-Marie Carlsson as Göteborgskan
 Gunilla Olsson as New Tenant (as Gunilla Ohlsson)
 Jan Wirén as Doctor (as Jan Wiren)

References

External links
 
 

1985 films
1985 drama films
Films directed by Hasse Alfredson
Swedish drama films
1980s Swedish-language films
Films whose director won the Best Director Guldbagge Award
1980s Swedish films